Samantha Economos (born 27 February 1994) is an Australian rugby league footballer who plays as a  for the New Zealand Warriors in the NRL Women's Premiership and the Canterbury-Bankstown Bulldogs in the NSWRL Women's Premiership.

She is a Prime Minister's XIII representative.

Background
Born in Bowral, New South Wales, Economos played field hockey before taking up rugby league.

Playing career
In 2017, Economos played rugby league for the Goulburn Workers Bulldogs. In 2018, she joined the Goulburn Stockmen.

In 2019, Economos joined the Canterbury-Bankstown Bulldogs in the NSWRL Women's Premiership. On 11 October 2019, she represented the Prime Minister's XIII in their win over Fiji.

2020
On 18 September, Economos joined the New Zealand Warriors NRL Women's Premiership squad. In Round 1 of the 2020 NRL Women's season, she made her debut for the Warriors in a 14–28 loss to the Brisbane Broncos.

References

External links
 
 
 

1994 births
Living people
Australian female field hockey players
Australian female rugby league players
Rugby league props
New Zealand Warriors (NRLW) players
People from Bowral
Rugby league players from New South Wales
2023 FIH Indoor Hockey World Cup players